Fayette County High School (FCHS) is located in Fayetteville, Georgia, United States. It was named a National Blue Ribbon School in 1999 and a Georgia School of Excellence in 2000. The school enrolls approximately 1,322 students in grades 9-12. Fayette County High is accredited by the Southern Association of Colleges and Schools. The school's mascot is a tiger.

Academics
The school graduates over ninety percent of its attendees. Its students' standardized test scores often exceed state and national testing averages. Most graduates who go to college attend in-state schools, particularly Agnes Scott College, Emory, Georgia Tech, University of Georgia, Georgia State University, Georgia Southern University, and Morehouse College.

History
Fayette County High School is at its fourth location.  The first two buildings burned: the first in the 1930s, and the second on March 4, 1954.  Before 1954, Fayette County offered no secondary education to its African-American citizens.  After the 1954 fire, Fayette County built two high schools in different locations: the white Fayette County High School on Lafayette Avenue, and the black Fayette County Training School on Booker Avenue.  When Georgia integrated its public schools in 1969, black students moved to Fayette County High, and the old Fayette County Training School became Eastside Elementary School.  In the mid-1990s, Fayette County High moved into a new campus across Tiger Trail from the old school.  The building that had housed FCHS from 1955 to 1995 is now home to Fayette Community School.

Fine arts
In the 1990s, the band, choral, orchestra, and drama departments received awards on the local, state, regional, and national levels.

The choral department's Select Chorus performed in Europe in 1999.

In 2019, the choral department rebranded and is now known as The Fayette Chorale.

The Marching Tigers have been a Bands of America regional finalist multiple times. The band performed in the 2000 Sydney Olympics Opening Ceremony, the 2005 London New Year's Day Parade, the 2007 Tournament of Roses Parade in Pasadena, California, and returned for the 2009 London New Year's Parade.

The fight song that the band plays after touchdowns is the "Tiger Rag", a common fight song for schools with Tiger mascots. Auburn, Clemson, and LSU all use the "Tiger Rag" in some capacity.

Athletics

The school colors are black and Vegas gold. The Tigers send competitors to state playoffs in baseball, basketball, soccer, volleyball, and wrestling on a regular basis.

Football
The 1980 team (10-2) was ranked #4 at season's end by the Atlanta Journal-Constitution.

Wrestling
The 2010 Tiger wrestling squad won the Area 5-AAAA Duals title.

Girls' basketball
The Fayette County Lady Tigers basketball team first rose to prominence in the mid-1980s, when current Hofstra University Head Basketball Coach Krista Kilburn-Steveskey starred for FCHS. The Lady Tigers advanced to the Class AAAA basketball state championship game in both 2008 and 2009, falling to Southwest Dekalb both times.

Softball
The Lady Tigers softball team won the 2002 Class AAAAA Championship. Ashley Holcombe, a member of the 2002 state title team, went on to star at Alabama and made Team USA in 2009 and 2010.

Esports
The Fayette County High School ESports team stream their matches on Twitch.

Debate
In the 2008–2009 season, the Fayette County Debate Team won the GFCA AAAA Policy Debate State Championship and GFCA Lincoln Douglas State Championship.

Notable alumni

 Brandon Boykin, 2011 Paul Hornung Award winner as a Georgia Bulldogs football player and cornerback for the Baltimore Ravens of the National Football League
 Mike Duke, an American businessman. He served as the fourth chief executive officer of Walmart from 2009 to 2013. Duke was elected a member of the National Academy of Engineering for leadership and contributions to the design and implementation of innovative logistics and retail technologies.
 Emmanuel Hudson, is a comedian, dancer, rapper, and actor known for his viral YouTube videos such as "Ratchet Girl Anthem" with his brother, Phillip Hudson. He is a member of Nick Cannon’s Wild 'N Out on MTV and has performed on America’s Got Talent.
 David Buchanan, KBO League pitcher for the Samsung Lions
 Matt Daniels, played football for Duke University and the St. Louis Rams
 Niko Goodrum, MLB outfielder for the Houston Astros
 Ronnie Mabra, former member of the Georgia House of Representatives
 Adam Smith, basketball player for Hapoel Holon in the Israel Basketball Premier League
 Jima Akhenjah-Weaver, Published Photographer, The Tennessean, videographer for ESPN

References

External links
Fayette County High School
Fayette County Board of Education: Fayette County High School
Fayette County High School ESports team on Twitch

1929 establishments in Georgia (U.S. state)
Educational institutions established in 1929
Public high schools in Georgia (U.S. state)
Schools in Fayette County, Georgia